De Lamere is a census-designated place and unincorporated community in Sargent County, North Dakota, United States. Its population was 30 as of the 2010 census. 

The town received its French name after an official with the Northern Pacific Railroad. The town was established in 1885 in Hall Township. It was and still is the only town in Hall Township.

At one time, the town had a train depot, church, school (DeLamere Dragons), general store, post office, grain elevators, blacksmith shop, pool hall, cream station, garages, and a town hall. The town also had its own newspaper (DeLamere Mistletoe.) and a bank (DeLamere State Bank).

Demographics

References

Census-designated places in Sargent County, North Dakota
Census-designated places in North Dakota
Unincorporated communities in North Dakota
Unincorporated communities in Sargent County, North Dakota